Kharsia in Chhattisgarh State, India

Geography

Demographics
 India census, Kharsia had a population of 17,387. Males constitute 51% of the population and females 49%. Kharsia has an average literacy rate of 71%, higher than the national average of 64.84%: male literacy is 79%, and female literacy is 63%. In Kharsia, 14% of the population is under 6 years of age.

Economy
Kharsia has witnessed major changes in its economic activities in last decade. It has very elaborate type of economy ranging from agriculture activities to ispat and power industries. Power plants have been installed around the city which are driving the financial system of the town and villages.

Transport
Kharsia is a station on the Tatanagar–Bilaspur section of Howrah-Nagpur-Mumbai line. It is also connected to major cities like Bilaspur, Raipur, Raigarh, Jharsuguda, Ambikapur through state and national highways.

Notable people
 Late Lakhiram Agrawal, Former Madhya Pradesh and Chhattisgarh BJP President and ex-Rajya Sabha MP 
 Late Nand Kumar Patel,  President Chhattisgarh Pradesh Congress Committees, First Home minister of Chhattisgar

References

It is the politics hub of chhatishgarh where

Cities and towns in Raigarh district